Crotalaria rotundifolia is a flowering plant in the genus Crotalaria. It is a perennial dicot with yellow flowers that grows in the Southeastern United States. It is part of the pea family (Fabaceae). The flower arrangement is raceme and the leaf type is simple. They die back in freezing temperatures. Common names for the species include rabbitbells.

References

rotundifolia